The PSLV-C50 is the 52nd mission of the Indian Polar Satellite Launch Vehicle (PSLV) and 22nd flight of PSLV in 'XL' configuration. The Polar Satellite Launch Vehicle (PSLV)-C50 was launched successfully from the Second Launch Pad, Satish Dhawan Space Centre at 10:11 (UTC) /15:41 (IST) carrying CMS-01 Communication Satellite.

Launch 
PSLV-C50 successfully launched on December 17, 2020, from Satish Dhawan Space Centre carrying CMS-01 Communication Satellite.

References 

Polar Satellite Launch Vehicle
Spacecraft launched by India in 2020
December 2020 events in India
Rocket launches in 2020